The Nomad Series is a box set by the Canadian alt-country band Cowboy Junkies, collecting the four individual albums of the Nomad series, Renmin Park, Demons, Sing in My Meadow, and The Wilderness on the first four discs, and on the final disc six of the seven songs from the Demons digital bonus disc, plus four previously unreleased songs worked on during the creation of the series.

Contents 
Each individual album is unique, but tied together with the Nomad painting series by the Nomad series of paintings by Enrique Martinez Celaya, by the maelstrom of creativity of creating four albums in eighteen months, and by the unifying voice of Margo Timmins. The box set also includes a 50-page booklet containing the ephemera that makes up a recording, such as photos and lyrics. The box set was released as a digital release from the Junkies website, as a CD set, and as a vinyl set by Diverse Records, with a bonus 12" record that includes live tracks from At the End of Paths Taken which are not included in the CD box set, although those tracks along with one other were sold digitally as a bonus disc for Sing in My Meadow.

Track listing

References

External links 

2012 compilation albums
Cowboy Junkies albums
Latent Recordings albums